Dugald Alexander MacDonald (born 20 January 1950) is a South African former rugby union player of Scottish origins. He played for  against the 1974 British Lions tour to South Africa.

His younger brother Donald was capped for  seven times.

Biography
He acted as the President of the University of Cape Town Rugby Club for 15 years with his tenure coming to an end during the first quarter of 2019. His elder son, Dugald MacDonald, plays flanker for the Oxford Greyhounds, while his younger son, Alexander MacDonald, played flanker for the University of Cape Town 1st team in 2011 and 2012.

Test history

See also
List of South Africa national rugby union players – Springbok no. 470

References

Bibliography
 Bath, Richard (ed.) The Scotland Rugby Miscellany (Vision Sports Publishing Ltd, 2007 )

1950 births
Living people
Scottish rugby union players
South African rugby union players
South Africa international rugby union players
Rugby union players from KwaZulu-Natal
South African people of Scottish descent
Western Province (rugby union) players